Antarctica is a soundtrack album by the Greek electronic composer Vangelis, released in 1983. It is the score of the 1983 Japanese film Antarctica ("Nankyoku Monogatari", lit. "South Pole Story") directed by Koreyoshi Kurahara, and was nominated by the Japan Academy for "Best Music Score".

Composition
Synthesisers of "Theme from Antarctica" conjure cold and desolation, but also a bright landscape not lacking in beauty. "Antarctica Echoes" has minimal melody showing the vastness of the landscape. "Song of White" is cold-sounding, while "The Other Side of Antarctica" has a sinister sound. "Deliverance" is the theme that plays at the end of the film.

Reception

Jim Brenholts of Allmusic described it as a very good "dynamic and dramatic set" of music, "conveying feelings of angst, isolation, and even desolation", but "does not convey the iciness that listeners would expect".

Track listing

Personnel 
Vangelis – composer of all instruments

Production
Vangelis – producer, arranger, sleeve design
Raine Shine – engineer
Alwyn Clayden – sleeve design

References

1983 soundtrack albums
Vangelis soundtracks
Polydor Records soundtracks